Mehmet Bölükbaşı (born 24 March 1978) is a Turkish goalkeeper playing for TFF Second League side İstanbulspor. He is a product of A. Sebatspor youth academy. Journeyman Mehmet spent most of his professional career with the UEFA Cup winner Galatasaray after being discovered by Fatih Terim while playing in the third division. He directly found a place in first eleven, however, with the arrival of Cláudio Taffarel he could never get the chance to play regularly. He was capped for the Turkish U21 team in 1998. When he became the third choice goalkeeper for Galatasaray, he left for İstanbulspor where his career went further down. After playing for several Anatolian sides, he returned to İstanbulspor in January 2008.

Honours
Galatasaray
Süper Lig: 1997–98, 1998–99, 1999–2000, 2001–02
Turkish Cup: 1998–99, 1999–00
UEFA Cup: 1999–00

References

Boluspor footballers
Çaykur Rizespor footballers
İstanbulspor footballers
Samsunspor footballers
Akçaabat Sebatspor footballers
1978 births
Living people
Turkish footballers
Turkey under-21 international footballers
Association football goalkeepers